Ali "Alilou" Bencheikh (born 9 January 1955 in the village of ath-wouaguag at the town El M'hir, Bordj Bou Arreridj, Algeria) is a former Algerian international footballer.

Biography
«Alilou», as he was known to the MC Alger fans, was born in the village of (at-waguag in the biban mountains of basse kabylie), close to the village of El M'hir daira of manssourah in the province of Bordj Bou Arreridj. He made his first team debut as a midfielder for MCA at age 17 and went on to win many trophies and awards on the way, including the club's only African Champions Cup in 1976. He was a member of the Algerian team at the 1982 World Cup.

Alilou was 19th in IFFHS voting for the African player of the century.

Club career
 1973-1988 MC Alger 
 1979-1980 DNC Alger 
 1986-1987 JSM Chéraga

Honours
Country:
 Played in the 1982 FIFA World Cup
 Played in the 1982 African Cup of Nations
 Won the gold medal at the 1978 All-Africa Games
 Won the bronze medal at the 1979 Mediterranean Games
 Has 63 caps for the Algerian National Team

Club:
 Won the African Champions League once with MC Alger in 1976
 Won the Maghreb Cup Winners Cup once with MC Alger in 1974
 Won the Algerian League 4 times with MC Alger in 1975, 1976, 1978 and 1979
 Won the Algerian Cup 3 times with MC Alger in 1973, 1976 and 1983

Personal:
 Voted as the runner-up for the 1978 African Footballer of the Year award
 Voted as third for the 1976 African Footballer of the Year award

References

External links
Player profile - dzfootball

1955 births
Living people
People from El M'hir
1982 African Cup of Nations players
1982 FIFA World Cup players
Algerian footballers
Association football midfielders
Algeria international footballers
MC Alger players
JSM Chéraga players
African Games gold medalists for Algeria
African Games medalists in football
Mediterranean Games bronze medalists for Algeria
Competitors at the 1979 Mediterranean Games
Mediterranean Games medalists in football
Competitors at the 1978 All-Africa Games
21st-century Algerian people